Aadel Lampe (10 May 1857 – 8 September 1944) was a Norwegian women's rights leader, liberal politician, teacher for deaf children and suffragist in the late 19th and early 20th century. She was elected as a deputy member of the Storting in 1922, as one of the first women elected to the Norwegian parliament, and served as president of the Norwegian Association for Women's Rights from 1922 to 1926.

Biography
Aadel Lampe was born at Stranda in Møre og Romsdal, Norway. Her father, Claus Ernst Lampe, was a parish priest.  She graduated as a teacher from the Nissen Higher School for Young Women in Kristiania (now Oslo) and was then employed as a teacher at Nissen's Girls' School. Later she worked as a teacher at Hedevig Rosing's skole, a school for deaf children in Kristiania.

She was one of the early leaders of the Norwegian Association for Women's Rights, and served as its president from 1922 to 1926. She joined the board of the organization in 1895 and served as vice president during the terms 1899–1903 and 1912–1922, when Fredrikke Marie Qvam and Randi Blehr were Presidents.

Lampe was originally a member of the Liberal Party, but later joined the conservative-liberal Free-minded Liberal Party, where she was a deputy member of the national executive and a board member of the party's women's association. Together with Randi Blehr and Cecilie Thoresen Krog, she was a co-signatory of a letter to the national government which called for women being admitted to the civil service. In the 1921 parliamentary election she was elected as a deputy member of the Storting for the term 1922–1924, representing the constituency of Christiania and an electoral list of the Free-minded Liberal Party and the Conservative Party. She was one of five women elected to the parliament, four of whom were deputy members and the fifth was Norway's first permanent MP, Karen Platou, who represented the same party list and the same constituency as Lampe.

References

Related reading
Lønnå, Elisabeth (1996) Stolthet og kvinnekamp : Norsk kvinnesaksforenings historie fra 1913 (Oslo: Gyldendal) 

1857 births
1944 deaths
People from Stranda
Norwegian women's rights activists
Norwegian feminists
Norwegian educators
Norwegian suffragists
Educators of the deaf
Free-minded Liberal Party politicians
Liberal Party (Norway) politicians
20th-century Norwegian politicians
20th-century Norwegian women politicians
Norwegian Association for Women's Rights people